Edward Grey Cooke (May 3, 1935 – February 6, 2022) was an American professional football defensive end and linebacker who played in both the National Football League and the American Football League.  In 1966, with the AFL's Miami Dolphins, he was selected to the AFL All-Star Team. Cooke played college football at Maryland and was drafted in the third round of the 1958 NFL Draft.

See also
List of American Football League players

1935 births
2022 deaths
People from Surry County, North Carolina
Players of American football from North Carolina
American football linebackers
American football defensive ends
Maryland Terrapins football players
Chicago Bears players
Philadelphia Eagles players
Baltimore Colts players
New York Titans (AFL) players
New York Jets players
Denver Broncos (AFL) players
Miami Dolphins players
American Football League All-Star players
American Football League players